Alfenus Varus was an ancient Roman jurist and writer who lived around the 1st century BC.

Life
Alfenus Varus (whose praenomen might have been Publius) was a pupil of Servius Sulpicius Rufus, and the only pupil of Servius from whom there are any excerpts in the Pandects.  Nothing is known about him except from a story preserved by the scholiast Helenius Acron, in his notes on the satires of Horace.  The scholiast assumes the "Alfenus Vafer" of Horace to be the lawyer, and says that he was a native of Cremona, where he carried on the trade of a barber  or a botcher of shoes, that he came to Rome to become a student of Servius, attained the dignity of consulship, and was honored with a public funeral.

Pomponius also states that Varus attained consulship, but this will not prove the rest of the scholiast's story to be true.  The Publius Alfenius Varus who was consul in 2 AD can hardly be the pupil of Servius; and it is conjectured that he may have been the jurist's son.  It is impossible to determine what credit is due to the scholiast on Horace: he must have found the story somewhere, or have invented it.  Indeed, he and other scholiasts do sometimes favor us with a commentary which tells us nothing more than the text.  The fact of an Alfenus being a native of Cremona, and of an Alfenus having been a pupil of Servius, and a learned jurist, and of an Alfenus having been consul, is quite enough to enable a scholiast with the assistance of the passage in Horace to fabricate the whole story of Alfenus, as he has given it.

Works
There are 54 excerpts in the Pandects from the 40 books of the Digesta of Alfenus; but it is conjectured that Alfenus may have acted only as the editor of the work of Servius.  It appears from the fragments of Alfenus that he was acquainted with the Greek language, and these fragments show that he wrote in a pure and perspicuous style.  A passage that appears in the Pandects shows that he was not a stranger to the speculations of the philosophers.  According to Aulus Gellius, Alfenus was somewhat curious in matters of antiquity, and Gellius quotes a passage from the thirty-fourth book of his Digest in which Alfenus mentions one of the terms of a treaty between the Romans and the Carthaginians.  Alfenus is often cited by later jurists.  The fragments in the Pandects are taken from the second to the seventh books of the Digest and there are fragments from the eighth book taken from the epitome by the jurist Paulus.  The entire number of books appears from the Florentine Index; the passage in Gellius quotes the thirty-fourth book; and a passage of Paulus cites the forty-ninth book.  Whether the epitome of Paulus went further than the eighth book or not, is uncertain.

The passage in Gellius: "Alfenus ... in libro Digestorum trigesimo et quarto, Conjectaneorum autem secundo," ("Alfenus says in the Digest and in the Conlectanea") &c., has given rise to some discussion.  It is clear that the passage in the Conlectanea is attributed to Alfenus, and it is also clear that only one passage is meant; or at most the same passage is referred to as being in two different works.  But apparently only one work is meant, and therefore we must conclude that the Digesta, which consisted of forty books, contained a subdivision called the Conlectanea.  Some critics have conjectured that the Conlectanea is the compilation of Aufidius Namusa, so that the passage cited by Gellius appeared in both the original work by Alfenus, and in the copious compilation of Namusa, which is made from Alfenus and other pupils of Servius.

See also
Alfena (gens)

References

1st-century BC Roman consuls
Varus
Ancient Roman jurists
Golden Age Latin writers
Imperial Roman consuls
Writers from Cremona